Mother and Baby is a British television series which aired on the BBC during 1951. The series followed the first twelve weeks of life of a baby named David Malcolm Suckling. It aired fortnightly for six episodes aired in a 20-minute time-slot.

Mother and Baby is also a media brand - a website testing and comparing products for parents.  The brand and site are owned by Bauer Media Group.

References

External links
Mother and Baby on IMDb
 Official website for Mother And Baby brand - https://www.motherandbaby.com 

1950s British documentary television series
1951 British television series debuts
1951 British television series endings
BBC Television shows
Black-and-white British television shows
British non-fiction television series